This is a filmography of Paul Newman:

As actor

Film

Video games

As director or producer

References

External links
 

Male actor filmographies
American filmographies